Wawonii may be,

Wawonii Island
Wawonii language